Albert Louis "Al" Lipscomb (15 June 1925 – 18 June 2011) was a seven-term Dallas City Council member and a longtime advocate for civil rights. He was the lead plaintiff in a lawsuit in the 1970s that successfully challenged Dallas' system of electing every council member citywide, forcing the city to change to a mostly single-member district system.

D Magazine called Lipscomb, who was the first black person to run for mayor, "the Jackie Robinson of Dallas city government". Several African-American officials credited him with opening doors for them. He won eight council elections and was one of the longest-serving council members in Dallas history at 14 years, with the record being 16 years.

Lipscomb was convicted of federal bribery charges in 2000, stemming from what prosecutors said were improper payments from a taxi cab company owner. The conviction was overturned on appeal in 2002.

Dealing with discrimination at early age 
Lipscomb was born in a southeast Dallas neighborhood and grew up in a home built by family members. In 2002, he described how, as a child, he often witnessed his grandfather having to get off the sidewalk whenever a white person passed, and take off his hat to pay respect. Lipscomb was also the frequent target of racially-motivated violence from other children.

These events helped mold Lipscomb into a civil rights advocate, he said. His mother, Lucille Jeffrey, was an organizer for Lyndon Johnson's War on Poverty who also greatly influenced him.

Lipscomb graduated from Lincoln High, working part-time as a busboy at the Adolphus Hotel during high school. He joined the U.S. Army Air Forces in 1943 during World War II, serving in California with the military police. After being discharged, he remained in California and said he "got involved in drugs". Lipscomb was arrested for selling heroin and was incarcerated for ten months of a one-year jail sentence. Lipscomb said he planned to return to Dallas sooner after being discharged from the Army since it was "home", but he got caught up in "a nightmare".

In the early 1950s, he moved back to Dallas, where he waited tables in restaurants. He met his future wife, Lovie Lipscomb, when they worked for the same hotel. He eventually became the headwaiter at the executive dining room of First National Bank. Among the restaurant's patrons was wealthy oilman H.L. Hunt, who would only request water and a phone since he brought his lunch in a sack. Hunt would sometimes work on a novel there, and he tipped the waiters well, Lipscomb said.

Joining the War on Poverty 

In 1966, Lipscomb, often sporting an Afro and bell bottoms, became a neighborhood organizer for the Dallas Community Action Agency, a nonprofit organization founded to work in the War on Poverty. Previously, he volunteered some with projects to challenge segregation launched by the Student Nonviolent Coordinating Committee, attending protests to open up drugstore counters and other facilities to black people. He also organized with Martin Luther King Jr.'s Southern Christian Leadership Conference and co-founded the Dallas chapter. In addition, he founded a clearinghouse for community problems, the South Dallas Information Center, and claimed to be the first person to be arrested and thrown out of Dallas City Hall.

A major issue of the time was trying to stop developers from buying out black homeowners at unfair prices for a proposed expansion of the State Fair of Texas in Fair Park. In 1969, Lipscomb, the SCLC's Rev. Peter Johnson and other community activists organized out of Mount Olive Lutheran Church. They were able to negotiate with then-Mayor J. Erik Jonsson for more favorable home buyout prices after threatening to stage a large demonstration during the nationally televised Cotton Bowl Parade.

In forcing a meeting with the mayor, the group had to endure bomb threats to the point that the police chief went to the church basement where the activists prepared for the protest and told them it wasn't safe to stay there. Rev. Johnson said he drew a line across the church basement floor and told everyone present that they were free to leave with no hard feelings. Anyone willing to brave the threats and more was asked to cross the line. "The first person to walk across that line was Albert Lipscomb," Johnson said. The mayor soon caved and agreed to the meeting.

Suing the city, winning council elections 
In 1971, Lipscomb became Dallas' first black candidate for mayor, finishing third in a field of seven. He ran for council and some other offices several more times before he was elected to the Dallas City Council in 1984.

In 1971, he also became the lead plaintiff in a lawsuit to challenge the City Council's method of electing members all at large. He and others argued in court that the system effectively discriminated against minorities and had resulted in very few non-white council members. U.S. District Judge Eldon Mahon's opinion, issued in January 1975, stated that the all at-large system was unconstitutional because it was "intentionally adopted and maintained to dilute the voting strength of African-Americans…. When all members of the City Council are elected at-large, the significance of this pattern of blacks carrying their own areas and yet losing on a citywide basis is that black voters of Dallas do have less opportunity than do the white voters to elect candidates of their choice."

Lipscomb won several more elections and became mayor pro tem in 1991, then left the council in 1993 due to a term-limit rule. Two years later, he won another election to the council and remained until he resigned in 2000 amidst a scandal over alleged improper payments by the owner of a taxi cab company.

Economic development in South Dallas was among the issues Lipscomb worked on during his council terms. He co-sponsored a community-based crime prevention program and was outspoken about police shootings of minorities and minority hiring policies.

Legal issues over alleged improper payments 

In 1999, Lipscomb and taxi cab company owner Floyd Richards were indicted on federal bribery charges. Richards was accused of making about $94,000 in illegal payments to Lipscomb and a son-in-law, Roderick L. Dudley, from 1984 to 1993. The indictment alleged that Lipscomb then strongly lobbied to approve city ordinances that aided Richards' businesses, effectively undercutting smaller competitors.

Lipscomb and his attorneys denied the charges. An attorney for Richards also denied giving money as "bribes with intent to improperly influence or reward" Lipscomb, but he said any payments were considered "aid and assistance" to Lipscomb. "The list of people and companies that have provided aid and assistance to Mr. Lipscomb would read like a who's who of Dallas," attorney Reed Prospere said.

Low council pay behind reason for payments, Lipscomb supporters say 

Before voters raised Dallas City Council members' salaries to $37,500 annually in 2001 and $60,000 in 2014, they were only paid $50 per meeting. Critics said the low pay was designed to ensure that only wealthy business people or their spouses – essentially volunteers who had their companies or spouses pay for what became a full-time job in a growing, major city - could serve on the council. Proponents argued that the council-manager form was implemented in Dallas in 1931 to curb corruption in city government and have a professional manager run the city as a business with the council as part-time board of directors.

But the council-manager form led to excesses, such as charges that the mayor and council members voted on contracts and issues that benefited their companies. In addition, lower-income citizens, such as Lipscomb, who had families to support had to make substantial sacrifices if they wanted some council representation. In trying to make ends meet while advocating for issues important to lower-income people, some accepted payments from wealthier citizens. Sometimes payments were made directly in cash, while others times they were diverted through a business run by them or a family member. Lipscomb stated that the payments he accepted came with "no strings attached". Dallas County Commissioner John Wiley Price, a long-time ally who Lipscomb mentored, said, "Most civil rights leaders in this city have probably always had beneficiaries in the white business community who could not afford to be identified. That comes all the way from the era of the Underground Railroad. But if the question is, was Al Lipscomb corrupted by that money, then the answer is definitely no."

In taking money from Richards, Lipscomb "took actions that hurt Mr. Richards' rivals", federal prosecutor Paul Coggins said. For instance, Lipscomb voted to substantially increase insurance requirements in 1996, which smaller competitors of Richards' companies claimed would force them out of business. Mayor Ron Kirk said Lipscomb was "a decent and fine human being who ought to be remembered for his efforts to democratize the political process." But Kirk said Lipscomb "may be guilty of errors in judgment and not having exercised the best business protocol." A vice president for Richards' company said the payments to Lipscomb were little different from the salary Kirk earned from "one of the largest law firms in the city that have clients who deal with the city every day."

The case went before U.S. District Judge Joe Kendall, who moved the venue to Amarillo, saying he thought Lipscomb's notoriety in Dallas and the case's publicity would not result in a fair trial there. Prosecutors made a deal with Richards to testify against Lipscomb and plead guilty to conspiring to commit bribery in return for a one-month prison sentence and nine months of home confinement. Lipscomb refused a plea deal, and the case went before an all-white jury in Amarillo.

In the trial, political consultant Linda Pavlik described how she worked with Richards to give money to Dudley, who loaned funds to support Lipscomb's 1995 council race. She said Richards once told her that he "bought and paid for" Lipscomb and another council member, even calling them the "n-word". Richards testified that the money he gave to Lipscomb was not contingent on him voting a certain way. But at another point, he admitted, "I'm paying a man a thousand dollars a month. He's going to vote for me."

The jury found Lipscomb guilty of 65 counts of bribery and conspiracy. He was forced to resign from the council, and Kendall sentenced him to 41 months of home confinement. But in 2002, a federal appeals court reversed the verdict, ruling that Kendall erred in moving the trial to Amarillo without citing evidence that unbiased jurors could not be located in the Dallas area.

Lipscomb feuds with Dallas mayor 
While in home confinement, Lipscomb said he was reading the Bible and trying not to hold animosity towards anyone. But he still reserved strong criticism for journalist and politician Laura Miller, who had written about the alleged improper payments from white business people to Lipscomb and other black leaders for several years. Miller wrote in 1996 about problems with a chemical business that Lipscomb helped run, how he allegedly voted for projects backed by his customers and benefactors as a council member. She called him "clueless when it comes to some things - integrity and ethics are good examples."

Lipscomb voluntarily turned over bank records and other revealing business documents to Miller, who detailed numerous payments and votes in an 11,000-word article. "For too long now, Lipscomb, the people who cynically control him, and the media who overlook it all, have made a complete mockery of our local political system," Miller charged. Miller's reporting was among those cited in the federal case against Lipscomb.

As Miller ran for Dallas mayor in late 2001, Lipscomb told a reporter, "If Hitler, Satan and Miller were running, I wouldn't vote for her." Council member James Fantroy, who beat Lipscomb in a 2005 race, said that many African Americans blamed Miller for black leaders' legal troubles.  In 2003, Miller informed a television reporter about a closed-door council session in which she objected to a Fantroy family company handling security for a proposed housing development, even though Fantroy recused himself from proceedings. While the city attorney said his recusal resolved any conflict, Miller still gave details to a reporter, whose broadcast reportedly caught the attention of local FBI agents. Investigations later resulted in Fantroy being convicted for embezzling money and council member Don Hill convicted for bribery.

Some black leaders and their lawyers charged that Miller herself took improper payments as a council member and mayor, including from the same housing developer who accused Hill of improper payments. Federal authorities said the payments to Miller were documented campaign contributions, while Hill received improper funds.

Personal 
Lipscomb was a longtime member of St. Mark's Baptist Church in southeast Dallas, where he was a deacon and sang in the choir. He was a board member and leader of numerous community organizations besides the SCLC, including the Martin Luther King Jr. Community Center, Dallas Legal Services and the Progressive Voters League.

Lipscomb and his wife, Lovie, had eight children, four from Lovie's previous marriage.

Honors 
The Texas Peace Officers Association, a black police officer organization, named Lipscomb "Man of the Year" in 1980. D Magazine listed him as one of "50 People Who Made Dallas" in a 1991 feature, calling him "the Jackie Robinson of Dallas city government." Lipscomb was "capable of passionate argument, unintentionally comic rhetoric and honeyed homilies from the Bible, but few doubt his commitment to social justice," the magazine wrote.

Lipscomb also received honors from the Texas Legislative Black Caucus, Martin Luther King Jr. Community Center and a civil rights center. In 2015, the city of Dallas renamed part of Grand Avenue to Al Lipscomb Way. The State Fair Classic annual football game was named after him from 1990 until 2000.

Death and legacy 
After battling diabetes and other health problems, Lipscomb died in 2011 at the age of 86. Longtime friend Eddie Sewell called him his hero. "He was my Malcolm X. He was my Nelson Mandela. He was my Martin Luther King." Fellow council member Diane Ragsdale noted that he "was one of the strong warriors and soldiers early on, and sometimes he was out there by himself…. You must have people like Al Lipscomb to push people forward."
His wife, Lovie, passed away in 2017.

References 

Dallas City Council members
1925 births
2011 deaths
Civil rights movement
African Americans in World War II
United States Army soldiers
United States Army personnel of World War II
Activists for African-American civil rights
21st-century African-American people
African-American United States Army personnel